Paul Stephen Paquet (born January 25, 1965 in Montreal, Quebec) is a nationally syndicated trivia columnist and a trivia writer, based in Ottawa, Ontario, Canada. In December 2008, he took over the Trivia Bits column from Stanley Newman. It runs in 14 newspapers throughout the United States. In 2015, he started writing a trivia column for Reader's Digest. In addition, he has written for Trivial Pursuit, Uncle John's Bathroom Reader, the Canadian game show Instant Cash and many others.

In 2007, Paquet won the North American leg of the World Quizzing Championships. In 2008, he finished in second place. He has since retired as a player and writes questions for the event itself.

In Ottawa, Paquet provides the questions for World Trivia Night, the world's largest live non-radio annual trivia event. A team he coached at Lisgar Collegiate also won the Ottawa championship for Reach for the Top, a Canadian version of Quiz Bowl. Paquet also runs the Ottawa Trivia League, which has been featured in a mini-documentary on TVOntario. He has also hosted the game "Smartypants" at various Game Show Congress and Trivia Championships of North America events beginning in 2005

References

1965 births
Living people
Journalists from Montreal
Journalists from Ontario
Writers from Montreal
Writers from Ottawa
Lisgar Collegiate Institute alumni